Maintenance-free operating period (MFOP) is an alternative measure of performance to the mean time between failures (MTBF), defined as the time period during which a device will be able to perform each of its intended functions, requiring only a minimal degree of maintenance. It was originally proposed in 1996 by the United Kingdom's Ministry of Defence, with intended application to military aircraft.

See also
Service life
Time between overhauls

References

Survival analysis
Reliability engineering